This is an episode list for the animated series Katie and Orbie. A total of 78 half-hour episodes (234 stories) were produced. The series premiered in 1994. In 1996, the series switched to digital ink and paint for coloring. The first 39 episodes were made by Lacewood Productions and from 2001 to 2002, another 39 episodes were made by Amberwood Entertainment. Each half-hour episode consists of three 7-minute different stories. The episodes' original Canadian air dates for the first three seasons are listed, and the episodes' original Canadian airdates for the last three seasons are currently unknown.

Episodes

Season 1 (1994)
Season 1 used single cel frame images to create this "picture-mation" technique.
1. The Thunderstorm/The Rabbit and How to Make It Stay/I Don't Want to be Different (January 28, 1994)
2. Yee Ping/6 Cents Doesn't go That Far/Mrs. Parette's Picture (February 4, 1994)
3. Katie's First Sleep Over/Burnt Toast/Where Does the Wind Go? (February 11, 1994)
4. The Day Orbie Learned His Address/Deadly Dick the Dreadful Dragon/The Babysitter (February 18, 1994)
5. Sore Throat/The Lemonade Stand/Where Have All the Ducks Gone? (February 25, 1994)
6. Park Swings/The Tree/The Day Chance Found a New Home (March 3, 1994)
7. Pizza with Pizzazz/I Didn't Break the Lamp/Toboggan (March 10, 1994)
8. Disappearing in The Dark/Puzzle Race/Skates (March 17, 1994)
9. Orbie and the Tuba/Great Uncle David/Andy's Birthday Present (March 24, 1994)
10. Taking Care of Chance/Story Dress/Katie and the Sad World (March 31, 1994)
11. Charisse/Book Work/Right Around the Corner (April 7, 1994)
12. Beach/Family Wall/Pow Wow (April 14, 1994)
13. Dinosaur Bones Aren't for Climbing/Dad of the Month/Drumsticks (April 21, 1994)

Season 2 (1995)
14. Made to Order Pancakes/The Chicken Pox Party/No Chance (April 28, 1995)
15. How Orbie Helped the Easter Bunny/Stone Cold Soup/Orbie's Wish (May 5, 1995)
16. Does it Have Eggs in It?/The Cottage/Am I Invisible? (May 12, 1995)
17. Mrs. Parette and the Disappearing Berries/The Baby Bird and Old Mr. Cobbs/The Day Arthur Smacked Katie (May 19, 1995)
18. The Circus/Chance and the Bird Bath/The Annual Bathtub Race (May 26, 1995)
19. The Movie/Nasty Night/Dashing Through the Snow (June 2, 1995)
20. The Umbrella/The Great Idea/Everybody Counts (June 9, 1995)
21. How Does the Band Fit in the Radio?/The Garage Sale/A Big Heart (June 16, 1995)
22. Katie's First Dance Class/Frozen Fin Cafe/Close to My Heart (June 23, 1995)
23. The Farm/Splash/Lulu (June 30, 1995)
24. Too Spooky For Me!/Wild Flower Bouquet/Two Fathers (July 7, 1995)
25. Nobody's Perfect/Bugs/Katie and the Fine Point (July 14, 1995)
26. T-Ball/Happy New Year/Kyra (July 21, 1995)

Season 3 (1996)
This is the first season which uses digital ink and paint for coloring, and the last produced by Lacewood.
27. Surprise!/Katie's Music Box/Shop and Seek (July 28, 1996)
28. The Library/Roller Skates/The Scary Movie (August 4, 1996)
29. Flying High/The Block Castle/Wet (August 11, 1996)
30. Fabulous Fashions/Happy Winter/Sunk (August 18, 1996)
31. The Attic/The Zoo/Katie Up a Tree (August 25, 1996)
32. The New Baby/Leaky Pipes/Orbits (September 1, 1996)
33. Hopscotch/The Paddle Boat/Everybody Gets the Blues (September 8, 1996)
34. The Shooting Star/Snow!/The Trip (September 15, 1996)
35. Bruce/Too Old to Play/Yummy Dessert (September 22, 1996)
36. The Treasure Hunt/The Piñata/The Bank (September 29, 1996)
37. The Memory Box/Too Many Treasures/Don't Talk to Strangers (October 6, 1996)
38. Mermaid/Chez K and O/That's Not my Name (October 13, 1996)
39. Camping/Troll Under the Bed/Puppy Love (October 20, 1996)

Season 4 (2001)
The first seasons produced by Amberwood Entertainment. Later on, it was produced by Entertainment Rights. Marked the return of the series after 5-year hiatus.
40. The New Bike/Sorry/Orbie and the Tooth Fairy (April 4, 2001)
41. In Kyra's Pocket/Sandbox/Yee Ping's Appendix (April 11, 2001)
42. Mrs. Parette's Necklace/Orbie and the Pumpkin Seed/Bryn's New Bracelet (April 18, 2001)
43. Chill/Christian/Seventh Wave (April 25, 2001)
44. Pizza/Sidewalk Storybook/The Argument (May 2, 2001)
45. The Snake in the Grass/Sprite/Homegrown Supper (May 9, 2001)
46. Street Hockey/Bubble Trouble/Chopsticks (May 16, 2001)
47. The Bike Path/The Neighborhood Picnic/Cleaning Out the Basement (May 23, 2001)
48. Spider/Cowboy Boots/Footprints (May 30, 2001)
49. Big City/Market/The Chocolate Factory (June 6, 2001)
50. Tom's Pool Party/Dancing Fairies/Peeheew!(Alt. title:Orbie and the Skunk) (June 13, 2001)
51. Belkis/Pretty Like Polly/The Wallet (June 20, 2001)
52. Sticky Fingers/The Train Museum/Babysitting Megan (June 27, 2001)

Season 5 (2001)
53. Katie's Paper Flower/The Car Wash/Just Doing my Job (September 5, 2001)
54. Science!/"911"/The Bedspread Painting Party (September 12, 2001)
55. My Favorite Song/The Milk Monster/Pills (September 19, 2001)
56. Katie's New Life/Snow Art/Tag Wrestling (September 26, 2001)
57. Hot Fudge Sundaes/The Badminton Game/The Fuse (October 3, 2001)
58. The Lumpy Bed/Vincent and the Art Gallery/The Buskers (October 10, 2001)
59. A Scary Story/John the Music Man/Orbie the Grouch (October 17, 2001)
60. The New Neighbour/A Perfect Place for Us/Charisse and the Soccer Game (October 24, 2001)
61. Star/Later/Rainy Day Zombies (October 31, 2001)
62. Burr!/Gutter Balls/The Nibbler (November 7, 2001)
63. Shannon/Grandma/Birds! (November 14, 2001)
64. Orbie and the Bullfrog/Two Brothers/The Loon (November 21, 2001)
65. Raccoon Rescue/Cheer Up Pals/Maple Sugar (November 28, 2001)

Season 6 (2002–2003)
66. The Wishing Fountain/Bunton Q. Bunny/Boo Who? (November 25, 2002)
67. The Fairground/Gray Day/Hearts! (December 2, 2002)
68. Orbie's Special Thing/Mine!/The Summer Grocery Store (December 9, 2002)
69. Tick Tock Dance/Katie's Rogue's Gallery/The Drawing Contest (December 16, 2002)
70. Willow Whispers/Pink!/The Pond Prince (December 23, 2002)
71. Decorate Your Bike Day/Lights!/Beach Bouncing (December 30, 2002)
72. 100%/The Snow Princess/Brave? (January 6, 2003)
73. Garden Fairies/Ice Dance/Stones (March 3, 2003)
74. Night Lights/The Garden Hose/The Notebook (March 10, 2003)
75. The Troll's Wish/Bears/Mist (March 17, 2003)
76. The Orchestra/The Winter Party/The Glitter Ball and the Magic Day (March 24, 2003)
77. The Steam Engine/Orbie in Snow/The Water Sprite's Pearl (May 5, 2003)
78. Tap Shoes/The Letter/I Really Love You (June 9, 2003)

References

Katie and Orbie